The 1957 Kent State Golden Flashes football team was an American football team that represented Kent State University in the Mid-American Conference (MAC) during the 1957 NCAA University Division football season. In their 12th season under head coach Trevor J. Rees, the Golden Flashes compiled a 3–6 record (1–5 against MAC opponents), finished in seventh place in the MAC, and were outscored by all opponents by a combined total of 138 to 114.

The team's statistical leaders included Ron Fowler with 508 rushing yards, Ken Horton with 304 passing yards, and Dick Mihalus with 100 receiving yards.

Schedule

References

Kent State
Kent State Golden Flashes football seasons
Kent State Golden Flashes football